Alwernia  is a town situated some  west of Kraków in the Chrzanów County, Lesser Poland Voivodeship, Poland.

History

The name of the town is taken from that of the Franciscan hermitage of La Verna in Tuscany, Italy. It was bestowed on the locality in 1616 by the castellan Krzysztof Koryciński. A monastery of the order of the Stigmata of Saint Francis of Assisi was built on high ground between 1625 and 1656. The church dates from the period between 1630 and 1676.

Below the monastery a settlement developed which in 1776 received the right to hold a market. In 1796 Alwernia is mentioned as being a small commercial and administrative centre.

After the Third Partition of Poland, the town became a part of the Austrian Empire, and since 1867 of Austria-Hungary. In the newly-reborn Poland, Alwernia administratively belonged to Kraków Voivodeship. After World War II, the town once again became a part of Kraków Voivodeship until 1998.

On 15 September 1993 Alwernia received its town charter.

Economy
Chemical works "Alventa" is located in the town. The works was built in 1923–1924, in the interwar period. It mainly focuses on producing phosphorus and chromium compounds, as well as fertilizers.

Transport

Road transport
Voivodeship road 780 directly passes through the town.

Rail transport
The Trzebinia–Wadowice railway, opened in 1899, passes through the town, however in October 2002 passenger service ceased. In 2017, a tourist draisine started operating on the closed railway. The railway infrastructure manager in Poland, PKP Polskie Linie Kolejowe, is planning to reconstruct the railway.

Tourist attractions and monuments

Alwernia's tourist attractions and monuments include:
 Baroque Bernardine monastery and church;
 Saint Florian chapel;
 the oldest firefighting museum in Poland – Małopolskie Muzeum Pożarnictwa.

References

External links

  
 Jewish community of Alwernia on Virtual Shtetl

Cities and towns in Lesser Poland Voivodeship
Chrzanów County
Kraków Voivodeship (1919–1939)